Name the Woman is a 1934 American mystery drama film directed by Albert S. Rogell and starring Richard Cromwell, Arline Judge and Rita La Roy. It is not a remake of the studio's 1928 silent film of the same name, although Variety wrongly reported this at the time.

Synopsis
A novice reporter tries to get his break by investigating the murder of the district attorney.

Cast
 Richard Cromwell as Clem Rogers 
 Arline Judge as Betty Adams 
 Rita La Roy as Marie Denton 
 Charles C. Wilson as Joel Walker 
 Thomas E. Jackson as Frank Martin 
 Bradley Page as Dave Evans 
 Henry Kolker as Judge Adams 
 Purnell Pratt as Forbes 
 Stanley Fields as Dawson 
 Crane Wilbur as Blake 
 Eddy Chandler as Chuck 
 Wallis Clark as Det. Jeffries 
 George Humbert as Louie 
 Al Hill as Maxie 
 Cyril Thornton as Reynolds 
 Beulah Hutton as Telephone Operator 
 Joseph P. Mack as Bartender 
 Fred Walton as Butler 
 Allan Sears as Hobbs

References

Bibliography
 Bernard F. Dick. Columbia Pictures: Portrait of a Studio. University Press of Kentucky, 2015.

External links

1934 films
1934 mystery films
American mystery films
1930s English-language films
Columbia Pictures films
Films directed by Albert S. Rogell
American black-and-white films
1930s American films